Diphascon faialense is a species of tardigrade in the genus Diphascon of the family Hypsibiidae and the subfamily Diphasconinae. The species is endemic to the Azores. The species was first described and named by Paulo Fontoura and Giovanni Pilato in 2007. The specific name refers to Faial Island, on which it was found.

References

Parachaela
Fauna of the Azores
Faial Island
Animals described in 2007
Taxa named by Giovanni Pilato